FC Sète won Division 1 season 1938/1939, the last professional football season before World War II, of the French Association Football League.

Participating teams

 FC Antibes
 AS Cannes
 SC Fives
 Le Havre AC
 RC Lens
 Olympique Lillois
 Olympique de Marseille
 FC Metz
 RC Paris
 Excelsior AC Roubaix
 RC Roubaix
 FC Rouen
 AS Saint-Étienne
 FC Sète
 FC Sochaux-Montbéliard
 RC Strasbourg

Final table

Promoted from Division 2, who would play in Division 1 season 1945/1946 (With the beginning of World War II, relegations and promotions are only taken into account after the end of the war i.e. for season 1945/1946)
 Red Star Olympique: Champion of Division 2
 Stade Rennais UC: Runner-up Division 2

Results

Top goalscorers

References
 Division 1 season 1938-1939 at pari-et-gagne.com

Ligue 1 seasons
France
1